

List of sacred places in Java 
 Note that Java has at least three main cultural regions determined in part by the linguistic usages.

Regions in Java 
However, as known in Javanese language usage, vocabulary usage in the south western central Java region (Cilacap) can be significantly different from north eastern central Java region (Mount Muria).

 Jakarta
 Sundanese (or West Java)
 Javanese (or Central Java and East Java)
 Tenggerese  (or Mount Bromo region)

In each region there are significant numbers of locations that are either currently known as sacred, or have been documented in the past as sacred places.

Places 

In most cases all Candi of Indonesia locations are considered as sacred - despite being in ruins or in advanced stages of decay.

 Borobudur in the Kedu valley west of Mount Merapi in central Java, Buddhist temple
 Mount Tidar in Magelang
 Makam - Mausoleum (sacred tombs)
 Imogiri south of Yogyakarta is a royal graveyard.
 Makam Wali Songo (The Tombs of the Wali Songo) the nine Islamic Saints who propagated Islam in Java.
 Sunan Ampel
 Sunan Kalijaga
 Sunan Muria
 Menang, in Pagu sub-district of Kediri Regency, dedicated to King Jayabaya of Kediri
 Prambanan, Hindu temple
 Ratu Boko
 Tembayat also known as Bayat
 Turgo a hill on the southern slopes of Merapi

See also 
Javanese sacred places  for categories.
Candi of Indonesia
Hinduism in Java
Indonesian Esoteric Buddhism
Kejawèn
Kraton (Indonesia)

Java
Javanese culture